Stephen Newton (1853–1916) was an English cricketer.

Stephen Newton may also refer to:

 Stephen Hibbert Newton (born 1955), Australian teacher
 Stephen Newton (artist) (born 1948), British artist

See also  
 Steve Newton (born 1941), American basketball coach
 Newton (disambiguation)
 Newton (surname)